Deconica montana, commonly known as the mountain moss Psilocybe, is a common species of mushroom that usually grows in mossy and montane regions around the world. The appearance is that of a typical "little brown mushroom" with a small, brown cap and a straight, thin stipe.

Taxonomy

Psilocybe montana was formerly the type species of the mushroom genus Psilocybe.  Because it does not contain hallucinogenic tryptamine derivatives like psilocybin or psilocin, it does not stain blue when handled, unlike other typical hallucinogenic members of this genus. Molecular studies in the late 2000s revealed that the genus was polyphyletic and consisted of two distinct clades separating the blueing species from the non-blueing species. Dividing the genus is problematic as the name Psilocybe was attached to P. montana and consequently to the non-blueing clade, leaving the hallucinogenic species without a generic name. Because the name is widely associated with the hallucinogenic species and considering the potential legal ramifications of changing their generic name, a proposal was made to conserve the name Psilocybe with P. semilanceata as the type. This left Deconica available as a name for the non-blueing species. The proposal was unanimously accepted by the Nomenclature Committee for Fungi in 2009.

Description 

The cap is 0.5–1.5 cm in diameter, initially convex in shape but flattening in age, sometimes with a broad umbo. The cap is moist, glabrous, hygrophanous, and has radial striations to the center; the color is reddish-brown to dark-brown. The gills are adnate to broadly adnate or sometimes very shortly decurrent, and of the same color as the cap. The stipe is 1.5–4 cm long, 1–2 mm thick, smooth, the same color as the cap, and brittle. Spores are typically 7.5–10 × 6–8 × 5–5.5 μm and ovate–lentiform in shape with a thickened wall. A large spored variety (spore dimensions of 8.5–11 × 6.0–8.5 × 5.0–7.0 μm), Psilocybe montana var. macrospora Noordel. & Verduin (1999), has also been reported from the Netherlands. The spore print is dark greyish brown.

It is listed as inedible, being too small to be of interest.

Habitat 

Deconica montana is saprobic, possibly also parasitic. It is often associated with mosses such as Brachythecium albicans, B. mutabulum, Campylopus introflexus, Ceratodon purpureus, Dicranum scoparium, Eurhynchium hians, E. praelongum, E. speciosum, Rhacomitrium canescens, Pohlia species or Polytrichum piliferum. It is commonly found in exposed situations such as dune-meadows, heaths and tree-less tundra, and open Pinus forests, usually on nutrient-poor, well-drained soil.

Distribution 

The species has a worldwide, almost cosmopolitan distribution and has been reported from a variety of regions in a wide range of climates, including:
 Britain (Thetford Forest)
 California, United States
 the Caribbean
 China (western Kunlun Mountains)
 Colombia (high plains of Guasca)
 Greenland
 Mexico
 Nepal
 Norway
 in alpine tundra as well as subalpine regions in Switzerland
 in the region formerly known as the USSR
 in the Venezuelan Andes and 
 in moss at high elevations in Idaho and Montana
 in Arctic tundra.

They have also been reported growing in Chemnitz, Germany, on vegetation-covered flat roofs.

References

Further reading
 Stamets P. (1996). Psilocybin mushrooms of the world. Ten Speed Press, Berkeley, CA, USA. 245 pp. (p. 132)

External links 
 Index Fungorum synonyms
 California Fungi
 BioImages Photos from various angles
 Mushroom Observer Photos of various D. montana sightings

Strophariaceae
Fungi of Asia
Fungi of Europe
Fungi of North America
Fungi of South America
Fungi of Colombia
Altiplano Cundiboyacense
Inedible fungi
Páramo fungi
Fungi described in 1871
Taxa named by Christiaan Hendrik Persoon